Through the Night may refer to:
BBC's title for the radio programme Euroclassic Notturno
Through the Night, a 2002 film by Sujin Kim
Through the Night (novel), a 2011 novel by Stig Sæterbakken
Through the Night (album), a 2012 album by Ren Harvieu
"Through the Night" (Drumsound & Bassline Smith song), a 2013 song by Drumsound & Bassline Smith
"Through the Night" (IU song), a 2017 song by IU
Through the Night (film), a 2020 American documentary film